Sparkplug Comic Books is a defunct publisher and distributor of alternative comics founded by cartoonist Dylan Williams. Based in Portland, Oregon, the company operated from 2002 to 2016. The publisher's backlist is now handled by Alternative Comics.

Cartoonists published by Sparkplug included Austin English, Jason Shiga, Renée French, Julia Gfrörer, Katie Skelly, Juliacks, Yumi Sakugawa, Whit Taylor, Elijah Brubaker, and Jeff LeVine.

Sparkplug eschewed traditional distributors and comic book retailers; instead focusing on festivals, conventions, and direct sales through the company website.

History 
One of Sparkplug's first projects, Jason Shiga's Fleep, was the 2003 Eisner Award winner for Talent Deserving of Wider Recognition. (Shiga's Bookhunter, published in 2007, was also nominated for a couple of industry awards.)

From 2008 to 2015 Sparkplug co-published annual mini-comic anthologies in commemoration of Free Comic Book Day; they were always produced in partnership with Tim Goodyear's company Teenage Dinosaur as well as other Portland-area small-press publishers.

Sparkplug founder Dylan Williams died of leukemia in September 2011; three projects were published posthumously via the crowdfunding site IndieGoGo.

After Williams' death, the company was run as a trio by Virginia Paine, Tom Neely, and Williams' widow Emily Nillson. 
Paine took over as sole publisher of Sparkplug in 2013.

Sparkplug shut down in June 2016, with the company's backlist moving to Alternative Comics.

Publications

Ongoing titles 
 Eschew (2 issues, 2010) – Robert Sergel
 Jin & Jam (1 issue, 2009) – Hellen Jo
 Papercutter (16 issues, 2006–2016) – (co-published with Teenage Dinosaur and Tugboat Press)
 Reich (12 issues, 2007–2014) – Elijah Brubaker
 Sparkplug Minis:
 Hungry Summer (2014) – Asher Craw
 The Anthropologists (2014) – Whit Taylor
 Bird Girl and Fox Girl (2014) – Yumi Sakugawa
 Ce/Za – Suzette Smith (2015)
 A Wretch Like Me (Oct. 2015) – Ebin Lee
 Tales to Demolish (3 issues, 2003–2006) – Eric Haven
 Watching Days Become Years (4 issues, July 2003–2007) – Jeff LeVine
 Windy Corner Magazine (3 issues, 2007–2009) – Austin English

Graphic novels, anthologies, collections, and one-shots 

 Asiaddict (2006) – Mats!
 Asthma (2006) – John Hankiewicz
 Bookhunter (2007) – Jason Shiga
 Christina and Charles (2006) – Austin English
 Danny Dutch (2009) – David King
 Department of Art (2009) – Dunja Jankovic
 The Disgusting Room (2011) – Austin English
 Edison Steelhead's Lost Portfolio: Exploratory Studies of Girls and Rabbits (June 2007)  – Renée French
 Fleep (2002) – Jason Shiga
 Flesh and Bone (2010) – Julia Gfrörer
 Gay Genius (2011) – edited by Annie Murphy 
 The Golem of Gabirol (2012) – Olga Volozova
 The Heavy Hand (2011) – Chris Cilla
 The Hot Breath of War (2008) – Trevor Alixopulos
 Inkweed (2007) – Chris Wright
 It Lives (2003) – Ted May
 Lemon Styles (2010) – David King
 Nurse Nurse (2012) – Katie Skelly
 Orchid (2002) – anthology of Victorian horror stories adapted into comics form, edited by Dylan Williams and Ben Catmull
 Passage (2012) – Tessa Brunton
 Reporter: Little Black (2002) – Dylan Williams
 Rock That Never Sleeps (2009) – Olga Volazova and Juliacks
 Whirlwind Wonderland (2010) – Rina Ayuyang (co-published with Tugboat Press)

Free Comic Book Day mini-comic anthologies 
 2008 Nerd Burglar– edited by Andrice Arp and Jeremy Tiedeman; co-published with Teenage Dinosaur and Tugboat Press
 2009 Bird Hurdler – co-published with Teenage Dinosaur and Tugboat Press
 2010 Dope Flounder – co-published with Teenage Dinosaur and Tugboat Press
 2011 Dan Quayl – co-published with Teenage Dinosaur, Revival House Press, and Gazeta Comics
 2012 Brad Trip – co-published with Teenage Dinosaur, Revival House, and Floating World Comics
 2013 Master P's Theater – co-published with Floating World Comics, Snakebomb Comix, and Teenage Dinosaur
 2014 Barrio Mothers – co-published with Floating World Comics, Snakebomb Comix, and Teenage Dinosaur
 2015 Free Stooges – co-published with Floating World Comics, Snakebomb Comix, and Teenage Dinosaur

References

Notes

Sources consulted

External links 
 Dylan Williams obituary on The Comics Reporter
 Dylan Williams tributes on The Comics Journal

Alternative Comics
Companies based in Portland, Oregon
Publishing companies established in 2002
Lists of comics by publisher
2002 establishments in Oregon